Nizhnekayancha is a rural locality (a selo) in Aysky Selsoviet, Altaysky District, Altai Krai, Russia. The population was 414 as of 2013. There are 9 streets.

Geography 
Nizhnekayancha is located on the Katun River, 61 km southeast of Altayskoye (the district's administrative centre) by road. Ustyuba is the nearest rural locality.

References 

Rural localities in Altaysky District, Altai Krai